"Wenn ich, o Schöpfer, deine Macht" (When I, O Creator, [reflect on] Your power) is a sacred poem in German by Christian Fürchtegott Gellert, titled "Preis des Schöpfers" (Praise of the Creator). It became a Christian hymn with an older melody by Peter Sohren.  It is still popular and appears in hymnals including the Protestant Evangelisches Gesangbuch and the Catholic Gotteslob.

History 
Gellert was a philosopher and poet of the Age of Enlightenment. He published the poem in a collection titled Geistliche Oden und Lieder (Spiritual Odes and Songs) in 1757, titled Preis des Schöpfers (Praise of the Creator).

The poem "Wenn ich, o Schöpfer, deine Macht" has six stanzas in bar form, also called Lutherstrophe, and is a praise of the Creation. A starting point for Gellert was the hymn "Sei Lob und Ehr dem höchsten Gut" (Praise and honour be to the highest good" (EG 326), but Gellert phrased freely and independently. He relied little on biblical wording, but drew from observations in nature. The first stanza mentions, from a position of reflection and adoration, that it is impossible to praise the greatness of the creation sufficiently, which is contradicted in the following stanzas. The second stanza begins "Mein Auge sieht, wohin es blickt, die Wunder deiner Werke" (My eye sees wherever it looks the miracles of Your works), with the following stanzas naming examples, concluding with man as body and mind ("Leib und Geist"). The final stanza calls all elements of creation to praise God as their origin. The poem is rich in rhetorical expressions.

The song is part of hymnals in German, including the Protestant Evangelisches Gesangbuch (1995) as EG 506, and the Catholic Gotteslob (2013), as GL 463, in the section Schöpfung (Creation).

References

External links 

 
 Meinrad Walter: Wenn ich, o Schöpfer, deine Macht (GL 463) Amt für Kirchenmusik Freiburg

German poems
17th-century hymns in German
1653 works